The culture of France has been shaped by geography, by historical events, and by foreign and internal forces and groups. France, and in particular Paris, has played an important role as a center of high culture since the 17th century and from the 19th century on, worldwide. From the late 19th century, France has also played an important role in cinema, fashion, cuisine, literature, technology, the social sciences, and mathematics. The importance of French culture has waxed and waned over the centuries, depending on its economic, political and military importance. French culture today is marked both by great regional and socioeconomic differences and strong unifying tendencies. A global opinion poll for the BBC saw France ranked as the country with the fourth most positive influence in the world (behind Germany, Canada and the UK) in 2014.

French culture 

The Académie Française sets an official standard of linguistic purism; however, this standard, which is not mandatory, is occasionally ignored by the government itself: for instance, the left-wing government of Lionel Jospin pushed for the feminisation of the names of some functions (madame la ministre) while the Académie pushed for some more traditional madame le ministre.

Some action has been taken by the government to promote French culture and the French language. For instance, they have established a system of subsidies and preferential loans for supporting French cinema. The Toubon law, from the name of the conservative culture minister who promoted it, makes it mandatory to use French in advertisements directed to the general public. Note that contrary to some misconceptions sometimes found in the Anglophone media, the French government neither regulates the language used by private parties in commercial settings, nor makes it compulsory that France-based WWW sites should be in French.

France counts many regional languages, some of them being very different from standard French, such as Breton (a Celtic language close to Cornish and Welsh) and Alsatian (an Alemannic dialect of German). Some regional languages are Roman, like French, such as Occitan. The Basque language is completely unrelated to the French language and to any other language in the world; it is spoken in an area that straddles the border between the southwest of France and the north of Spain.

Many of these languages have enthusiastic advocates; however, the real importance of local languages remains subject to debate. In April 2001, the Minister of Education, Jack Lang, admitted formally that for more than two centuries, the political powers of the French government had repressed regional languages. He announced that bilingual education would, for the first time, be recognised, and bilingual teachers recruited in French public schools to support teaching these other languages. 
In French schools, pupils are expected to learn at least two foreign languages, the first of which is typically German or English.

A revision of the French constitution creating official recognition of regional languages was implemented by the Parliament in Congress at Versailles in July 2008.

Religions in France

France is a secular country where freedom of thought and of religion is preserved, by virtue of the 1789 Declaration of the Rights of Man and of the Citizen. The Republic is based on the principle of laïcité, that is of freedom of religion (including of agnosticism and atheism) enforced by the Jules Ferry laws and the 1905 law on the separation of the State and the Church, enacted at the beginning of the Third Republic (1871–1940). A 2011 European poll found that a third (33%) of the French population "does not believe there is any sort of spirit, God or life force. In 2011, in a poll published by Institut français d'opinion publique 65% of the French population describes itself as Christians, and 25% as not adhering any religion.

According to Eurobarometer poll in 2012, Christianity is the largest religion in France accounting 60% of French citizens. Catholics are the largest Christian group in France, accounting for 50% of French citizens, while Protestants make up 8%, and other Christians make up 2%. Non believer/Agnostic account for 20%, Atheist 13%, and Muslim 7%.

France guarantees freedom of religion as a constitutional right, and the government generally respects this right in practice. A long history of violent conflict between groups led the state to break its ties to the established Catholic Church early in the last century, which previously had been the state religion. The government adopted a strong commitment to maintaining a totally secular public sector.

Catholicism

Long the established state religion, the Catholic Church has historically played a significant role in French culture and in French life. Kings were prominent members as well as head of the state and social order. Most French people are Catholics; however, many of them are secular but still place high value on Catholicism.

The Catholic faith is no longer considered the state religion, as it was before the 1789 Revolution and throughout the various, non-republican regimes of the 19th century (the Restoration, the July Monarchy and the Second Empire). The institutional split of the Catholic Church and French State ("Séparation de l'Eglise et de l'Etat") was imposed by the latter in 1905 and represented the crest of a wave of the laicist and anti-clericalist movement among French Radical Republicans in this period.

At the beginning of the 20th century, France was a largely rural country with conservative Catholic mores, but in the hundred years since then, the countryside has become depopulated as people have become urbanized. The urban populations have become more secular. A December 2006 poll by Harris Interactive, published in The Financial Times, found that 32% of the French population described themselves as agnostic, some 32% as atheist, and only 27% believed in any type of God or supreme being. according to the French Market research Ipsos, Catholics today constitute 57.5% of the French population.

Protestantism

France was touched by the Reformation during the 16th century; some 30% of the population converted to Protestantism and became known as French Huguenots. Some princes joined the reform movement. But the national monarchy felt threatened by people who wanted to leave the established state religion. Protestants were discriminated against and suppressed. On 24 August 1572, the St. Bartholomew's Day massacre took place in Paris and the French Wars of Religion are considered to have begun. this French civil war took place between Catholics, led by Henry I, Duke of Guise, and Protestants, led by Henri de Navarre. Henri de Navarre became king after converting to Catholicism in 1589.

Louis XIII, Henri IV's son, began to suppress Protestants in violent attacks, such as the Siege of La Rochelle. After Louis XIV revoked the Edit de Nantes in 1685, Protestants who did not leave the country were generally suppressed. Thousands of Protestant Huguenots emigrated from France for their safety and to gain religious freedom, generally going to Protestant nations such as the Netherlands, England, South Africa, and the North American colonies. Their exile continued during the 17th century and until 1787, when religious freedom was re-established by Louis XVI.

Judaism

The current Jewish community in France numbers around 600,000, according to the World Jewish Congress and 500,000 according to the Appel Unifié Juif de France. It is concentrated in the metropolitan areas of Paris, Marseille and Strasbourg.

The history of the Jews in France dates back over 2,000 years. In the early Middle Ages, France was a center of Jewish learning, but persecution increased as the Middle Ages wore on. France was the first country in Europe to emancipate its Jewish population during the French Revolution, but despite legal equality anti-Semitism remained an issue, as illustrated in the Dreyfus affair of the late 19th century. However, through the 1870 Décret Crémieux, France secured full citizenship for the Jews in then French-ruled Algeria. Despite the death of a quarter of all French Jews during the Holocaust, France currently has the largest Jewish population in Europe.

In the early 21st century, French Jews are mostly Sephardic and of North African origins. More than a quarter of the historic Ashkenazi Jewish community was destroyed during the Holocaust of World War II after German forces occupied France and established the Vichy Regime. Jewish religious affiliations range from the ultra-Orthodox Haredi communities to the large segment of Jews who are secular and identify culturally as Jews.

Islam

Islam is the third-largest faith in France in the early 21st century. The Grande Mosquée was constructed in Paris in 1929 in honour of French colonial troops from North Africa who fought in the First World War. Arabs from North Africa started to settle in France. In the early 21st century, France had the largest Muslim population (in percentage) of any Western European country. This is a result of immigration and permanent family settlement in France, from the 1960s on, of groups from, principally, former French colonies in North Africa (Algeria, Morocco, Tunisia), and, to a lesser extent, other areas such as Turkey and West Africa. The government does not collect data on religious beliefs in census records, but estimates and polls place the percentage of Muslims at between 4% and 7%.

Buddhism

Buddhism is widely reported to be the fifth largest religion in France, after Christianity, atheism, Islam, and Judaism. France has over two hundred Buddhist meditation centers, including about twenty sizable retreat centers in rural areas. The Buddhist population mainly consists of Chinese and Vietnamese immigrants, with a substantial minority of native French converts and "sympathizers". The rising popularity of Buddhism in France has been the subject of considerable discussion in the French media and academy in recent years. The Plum Village Tradition school of Buddhism was developed in France with the Plum Village Monastery located in the in the Dordogne.

Cults and new religious movements
France created in 2006 the first French parliamentary commission on cult activities which led to a report registering a number of cults considered as dangerous. Supporters of such movements have criticized the report on the grounds of the respect of religious freedom. Proponents of the measure contend that only dangerous cults have been listed as such, and state secularism ensures religious freedom in France.

Regional customs and traditions
Modern France is the result of centuries of nation building and the acquisition and incorporation of a number of historical provinces and overseas colonies into its geographical and political structure. These regions all evolved with their own specific cultural and linguistic traditions in fashion, religious observance, regional language and accent, family structure, cuisine, leisure activities, industry, and including the simple way to pour wine, etc.

The evolution of the French state and culture, from the Renaissance up to this day, has however promoted a centralization of politics, media and cultural production in and around Paris (and, to a lesser extent, around the other major urban centers), and the industrialization of the country in the 20th century has led to a massive move of French people from the countryside to urban areas. At the end of the 19th century, around 50% of the French depended on the land for a living; today French farmers only make up 6–7%, while 73% live in cities. Nineteenth century French literature abounds in scenes of provincial youth "coming up" to Paris to "make it" in the cultural, political or social scene of the capital (this scheme is frequent in the novels of Balzac). Policies enacted by the French Third Republic also encouraged this displacement through mandatory military service, a centralized national educational system, and suppression of regional languages. While government policy and public debate in France in recent years has returned to a valorization of regional differences and a call for decentralization of certain aspects of the public sphere (sometimes with ethnic, racial or reactionary overtones), the history of regional displacement and the nature of the modern urban environment and of mass media and culture have made the preservation of a regional "sense of place or culture" in today's France extremely difficult.

The names of the historical French provinces – such as Brittany (Bretagne), Berry, Orléanais, Normandy (Normandie), Languedoc, Lyonnais, Dauphiné, Champagne, Poitou, Guyenne and Gascony (Gascogne), Burgundy (Bourgogne), Picardy (Picardie), Provence, Touraine, Limousin, Auvergne, Béarn, Alsace, Flanders, Lorraine, Corsica (Corse), Savoy (Savoie)... (please see individual articles for specifics about each regional culture) — are still used to designate natural, historical and cultural regions, and many of them appear in modern région or département names.  These names are also used by the French in their self-identification of family origin.

Regional identification is most pronounced today in cultures linked to regional languages and non-French-speaking traditions – French language itself being only a dialect of Langue d'oïl, the mother language of many of the languages to-be-mentioned, which became a national vehicular language, like (in alphabetical order): Alsatian, Arpitan, Basque, Brezhoneg (Breton), Burgundian, Corsu (Corsican), Català (Catalan), Francique, Gallo, Lorrain, Norman, Occitan, Picard, Poitevin, Saintongeais, etc., and some of these regions have promoted movements calling for some degree of regional autonomy, and, occasionally, national independence (see, for example, Breton nationalism, Corsica and Occitania).

There are huge differences in life style, socioeconomic status and world view between Paris and the provinces.  The French often use the expression "la France profonde" ("Deep France", similar to "heartland") to designate the profoundly "French" aspects of provincial towns, village life and rural agricultural culture, which escape the hegemony of Paris.  The expression can however have a pejorative meaning, similar to the expression "le désert français" ("the French desert") used to describe a lack of acculturation of the provinces.  Another expression, "terroir" is a French term originally used for wine and coffee to denote the special characteristics that geography bestowed upon these products. It can be very loosely translated as "a sense of place" which is embodied in certain qualities, and the sum of the effects that the local environment (especially the "soil") has had on the growth of the product.  The use of the term has since been generalized to talk about many cultural products.

In addition to its metropolitan territory, France also consists of overseas departments made up of its former colonies of Guadeloupe, Martinique and French Guiana in the Caribbean, and Mayotte and Réunion in the Indian Ocean.  (There also exists a number of "overseas collectivities" and "overseas territories".  For a full discussion, see administrative divisions of France.  Since 1982, following the French government's policy of decentralisation, overseas departments have elected regional councils with powers similar to those of the regions of metropolitan France. As a result of a constitutional revision which occurred in 2003, these regions are now to be called overseas regions.) These overseas departments have the same political status as metropolitan departments and are integral parts of France, (similar to the way in which Hawaii is a state and an integral part of the United States), yet they also have specific cultural and linguistic traditions which set them apart.  Certain elements of overseas culture have also been introduced to metropolitan culture (as, for example, the musical form the biguine).

Industrialization, immigration and urbanization in the nineteenth and twentieth centuries have also created new socioeconomic regional communities in France, both urban (like Paris, Lyon, Villeurbanne, Lille, Marseille, etc.) and the suburban and working class hinterlands (like Seine-Saint-Denis) of urban agglomerations (called variously banlieues ("suburbs", sometimes qualified as "chic" or "pauvres" or les cités "housing projects")) which have developed their own "sense of place" and local culture (much like the various boroughs of New York City or suburbs of Los Angeles), as well as cultural identity.

Other specific communities
Paris has traditionally been associated with alternative, artistic or intellectual subcultures, many of which involved foreigners. Such subcultures include the "Bohemians" of the mid-nineteenth century, the Impressionists, artistic circles of the Belle époque (around such artists as Picasso and Alfred Jarry), the Dadaists, Surrealists, the "Lost Generation" (Hemingway, Gertrude Stein) and the post-war "intellectuals" associated with Montparnasse (Jean-Paul Sartre, Simone de Beauvoir).

France has an estimated 280,000–340,000 Roma, generally known as Gitans, Tsiganes, Romanichels (slightly pejorative), Bohémiens, or Gens du voyage ("travellers").

There are gay and lesbian communities in the cities, particularly in the Paris metropolitan area (such as in Le Marais district of the capital). Although homosexuality is perhaps not as well tolerated in France as in Spain, Scandinavia, and the Benelux nations, surveys of the French public reveal a considerable shift in attitudes comparable to other Western European nations. , 55% of the French consider homosexuality "an acceptable lifestyle." The past mayor of Paris, Bertrand Delanoë, is gay.
A 2017 Pew Research Center poll found that 73% of French people were in favour of same-sex marriage, while 23% were opposed. The 2019 Eurobarometer found that 79% of French respondents thought same-sex marriage should be allowed throughout Europe, 15% were against. Additionally, 85% believed gay, lesbian and bisexual people should enjoy the same rights as heterosexual people.

See also LGBT rights in France.

Families and romantic relationships

Household structure
Growing out of the values of the Catholic Church and rural communities, the basic unit of French society was traditionally held to be the family. Over the twentieth century, the "traditional" family structure in France has evolved from various regional models (including extended families and nuclear families) to, after World War II, nuclear families.  Since the 1960s, marriages have decreased and divorces have increased in France, and divorce law and legal family status have evolved to reflect these social changes.

According to INSEE figures, household and family composition in metropolitan France continues to evolve.  Most significantly, from 1982 to 1999, single parent families have increased from 3.6% to 7.4%; there have also been increases in the number of unmarried couples, childless couples, and single men (from 8.5% to 12.5) and women (from 16.0% to 18.5%). Their analysis indicates that "one in three dwellings are occupied by a person living alone; one in four dwellings are occupied by a childless couple.."

Voted by the French Parliament in November 1999 following some controversy, the pacte civil de solidarité ("civil pact of solidarity") commonly known as a PACS, is a form of civil union between two adults (same-sex or opposite-sex) for organizing their joint life.  It brings rights and responsibilities, but less so than marriage.  From a legal standpoint, a PACS is a "contract" drawn up between the two individuals, which is stamped and registered by the clerk of the court.  Individuals who have registered a PACS are still considered "single" with regard to family status for some purposes, while they are increasingly considered in the same way as married couples are for other purposes.  While it was pushed by the government of Prime Minister Lionel Jospin in 1998, it was also opposed, mostly by people on the right-wing who support traditionalist family values and who argued that PACS and the recognition of homosexual unions would be disastrous for French society.

, same-sex marriage is legally recognized in France. Same-sex marriage was an important factor in the presidential election of 2012 between François Hollande and Nicolas Sarkozy. Sarkozy, who represents the right-wing UMP party, opposed gay marriage, while François Hollande, of the left wing socialist party, supported it. Hollande was elected in May 2012 and his government proposed the law known as "Mariage pour tous" ("marriage for all") to the parliament in November 2012. The law was passed in April 2013 and validated by the Conseil constitutionnel (the constitutional council, tasked with insuring that the new laws passed do not contradict the French constitution) in May 2013. The first French same-sex marriage took place on 29 May 2013 in Montpellier.

Role of the State
The French state has traditionally played an important role in promoting and supporting culture through the educational, linguistic, cultural and economic policies of the government and through its promotion of national identity.  Because of the closeness of this relationship, cultural changes in France are often linked to, or produce, political crisis.

The relationship between the French state and culture is an old one. Under Louis XIII's minister Richelieu, the independent Académie française came under state supervision and became an official organ of control over the French language and seventeenth-century literature. During Louis XIV's reign, his minister Jean-Baptiste Colbert brought French luxury industries, like textile and porcelain, under royal control and the architecture, furniture, fashion and etiquette of the royal court (particularly at the Château de Versailles) became the preeminent model of noble culture in France (and, to a great degree, throughout Europe) during the latter half of the seventeenth century.

At times, French state policies have sought to unify the country around certain cultural norms, while at other times they have promoted regional differences within a heterogeneous French identity.  The unifying effect was particularly true of the "radical period"" of the French Third Republic which fought regionalisms (including regional languages), supported anti-clericalism and a strict separation of church from state (including education) and actively promoted national identity, thus converting (as the historian Eugen Weber has put it) a "country of peasants into a nation of Frenchmen".  The Vichy Regime, on the other hand, promoted regional "folk" traditions.

The cultural policies of the (current) French Fifth Republic have been varied, but a consensus seems to exist around the need for preservation of French regionalisms (such as food and language) as long as these don't undermine national identity.  Meanwhile, the French state remains ambivalent over the integration into "French" culture of cultural traditions from recent immigrant groups and from foreign cultures, particularly American culture (movies, music, fashion, fast food, language, etc.).  There also exists a certain fear over the perceived loss of French identity and culture in the European system and under American "cultural hegemony".

Education

The French educational system is highly centralized. It is divided into three different stages: primary education, or enseignement primaire, corresponding to grade school in the United States; secondary education, or collège and lycée, corresponding to middle and high school in the United States; and higher education (l'université or les Grandes écoles).

Primary and secondary education is predominantly public (private schools also exist, in particular a strong nationwide network of primary and secondary Catholic education), while higher education has both public and private elements. At the end of secondary education, students take the baccalauréat exam, which allows them to pursue higher education. The baccalauréat pass rate in 2012 was 84.5%.

In 1999–2000, educational spending amounted to 7% of the French GDP and 37% of the national budget.

France's performance in math and science at the middle school level was ranked 23 in the 1995 Trends in International Math and Science Study. France was ranked 22 in 2019.

Since the Jules Ferry laws of 1881–2, named after the then Minister of Public Instruction, all state-funded schools, including universities, are independent from the (Roman Catholic) Church. Education in these institutions is free. Non-secular institutions are allowed to organize education as well. The French educational system differs strongly from Northern-European and American systems in that it stresses the importance of partaking in a society as opposed to being responsibly independent.

Secular educational policy has become critical in recent issues of French multiculturalism, as in the "affair of the Islamic headscarf".

Minister of Culture

The Minister of Culture is in the Government of France, the cabinet member in charge of national museums and monuments; promoting and protecting the arts (visual, plastic, theatrical, musical, dance, architectural, literary, televisual and cinematographic) in France and abroad; and managing the national archives and regional "maisons de culture" (culture centres). The Ministry of Culture is located on the Palais Royal in Paris.

The modern post of Minister of Culture was created by Charles de Gaulle in 1959 and the first Minister was the writer André Malraux.  Malraux was responsible for realizing the goals of the "droit à la culture" ("the right to culture") – an idea which had been incorporated in the French constitution and the Universal Declaration of Human Rights (1948) – by democratizing access to culture, while also achieving the Gaullist aim of elevating the "grandeur" ("greatness") of post-war France.  To this end, he created numerous regional cultural centres throughout France and actively sponsored the arts.  Malraux's artistic tastes included the modern arts and the avant-garde, but on the whole he remained conservative.

The Ministry of Jacques Toubon was notable for a number of laws (the "Toubon Laws") enacted for the preservation of the French language, both in advertisements (all ads must include a French translation of foreign words) and on the radio (40% of songs on French radio stations must be in French), ostensibly in reaction to the presence of English.

Académie Française

The Académie Française (English: French Academy) is the pre-eminent French learned body on matters pertaining to the French language. The Académie was officially established in 1635 by Cardinal Richelieu, the chief minister to King Louis XIII. Suppressed in 1793 during the French Revolution, it was restored in 1803 by Napoleon Bonaparte (the Académie considers itself having been suspended, not suppressed, during the revolution). It is the oldest of the five académies of the Institut de France.

The Académie consists of forty members, known as immortels (immortals). New members are elected by the members of the Académie itself. Académicians hold office for life, but they may be removed for misconduct. The body has the task of acting as an official authority on the language; it is charged with publishing an official dictionary of the language. Its rulings, however, are only advisory; not binding on either the public or the government.

Military service
Until 1996, France had compulsory military service of young men. This has been credited by historians for further promoting a unified national identity and by breaking down regional isolationism.

Labour and employment policy
In France, the first labour laws were Waldeck Rousseau's laws passed in 1884. Between 1936 and 1938 the Popular Front enacted a law mandating 12 days (2 weeks) each year of paid vacation for workers, and a law limiting the work week to 40 hours, excluding overtime. The Grenelle accords negotiated on 25 and 26 May in the middle of the May 1968 crisis, reduced the working week to 44 hours and created trade union sections in each enterprise.<ref>fr:section syndicale d'entreprise 27 December 1968 law</ref> The minimum wage was also increased by 25%. In 2000 Lionel Jospin's government then enacted the 35-hour workweek, down from 39 hours. Five years later, conservative prime minister Dominique de Villepin enacted the New Employment Contract (CNE). Addressing the demands of employers asking for more flexibility in French labour laws, the CNE sparked criticism from trade unions and opponents claiming it was lending favour to contingent work. In 2006 he then attempted to pass the First Employment Contract (CPE) through a vote by emergency procedure, but that it was met by students and unions' protests. President Jacques Chirac finally had no choice but to repeal it.

Healthcare and social welfare
The French are profoundly committed to the public healthcare system (called "sécurité sociale") and to their "pay-as-you-go" social welfare system.

In 1998, 75% of health payments in France were paid through the public healthcare system. Since 27 July 1999, France has a universal medical coverage for permanent residents in France (stable residence for more than three months). Using five performance indicators to measure health systems in 191 member states, it finds that France provides the best overall health care followed among major countries by Italy, Spain, Oman, Austria and Japan (The World Health Report).

Lifestyle

Food and alcohol

Traditional French culture places a high priority on the enjoyment of food. French cuisine was codified in the 20th century by Georges Auguste Escoffier to become the modern version of haute cuisine. Escoffier's major work, however, left out much of the regional character to be found in the provinces of France. Gastro-tourism and the Guide Michelin helped to bring people to the countryside during the 20th century and beyond, to sample this rich bourgeois and peasant cuisine of France. Basque cuisine has also been a great influence over the cuisine in the southwest of France.

Ingredients and dishes vary by region (see: Regional cuisine). There are many significant regional dishes that have become both national and regional. Many dishes that were once regional, however, have proliferated in different variations across the country in the present day. Cheese (see: List of French cheeses) and wine (see: French wine) are also a major part of the cuisine, playing different roles both regionally and nationally with their many variations and Appellation d'origine contrôlée (AOC) (regulated appellation) laws, (lentils from Le Puy-en-Velay also have an AOC status). Another French product of special note is the Charolais cattle.

The French typically eat only a simple breakfast ("petit déjeuner") which consists of coffee, tea or hot chocolate with milk, served traditionally in a large handleless "bol" (bowl) and bread or breakfast pastries (croissants). Lunch ("déjeuner") and dinner ("dîner") are the main meals of the day. Formal four course meals consist of a starter course ("entrée"), a salad, a main course ("plat principal"), and finally a cheese or dessert course. While French cuisine is often associated with rich desserts, in most homes dessert consists of only fruit or yogurt.

Food shopping in France was formerly done almost daily in small local shops and markets, but the arrival of the supermarket and the even larger "hypermarchés" (large-surface distributors) in France have disrupted this tradition. With depopulation of the countryside, many towns have been forced to close shops and markets.

Rates of obesity and heart disease in France have traditionally been lower than in other north-western European countries. This is sometimes called the French paradox (see, for example, Mireille Guiliano's 2006 book French Women Don't Get Fat). French cuisine and eating habits have however come under great pressure in recent years from modern fast food, such as American products and the new global agricultural industry. While French youth culture has gravitated toward fast food and American eating habits (with an attendant rise in obesity), the French in general have remained committed to preserving certain elements of their food culture through such activities as including programs of taste acquisition in their public schools, by the use of the appellation d'origine contrôlée laws, and by state and European subsidies to the French agricultural industry. Emblematic of these tensions is the work of José Bové, who founded in 1987, the Confédération Paysanne, an agricultural union that places its highest political values on humans and the environment, promotes organic farming and opposes genetically modified organisms; Bové's most famous protest was the dismantling of a McDonald's franchise in Millau (Aveyron), in 1999.

In France, cutlery is used in the continental manner (with the fork in the left hand, prongs facing down and the knife in the right hand). French etiquette prohibits the placing of hands below the table and the placing of elbows on it.

The legal drinking age is officially 18 (see: Legal drinking age).

France is one of the oldest wine producing regions of Europe. France now produces the most wine by value in the world (although Italy rivals it by volume and Spain has more land under cultivation for wine grapes). Bordeaux wine, Bourgogne wine and Champagne are important agricultural products.

Tobacco and drugs
The cigarette smoking age is 18 years. According to a widespread cliché, smoking has been part of French culture – actually figures indicate that in terms of consumption per capita, France is only the 60th country out of 121.

France, from 1 February 2007, tightened the existing ban on smoking in public places found in the 1991 Évin law: Law n°91-32 of 10 January 1991, containing a variety of measures against alcoholism and tobacco consumption.

Smoking is now banned in all public places (stations, museums, etc.); an exception exists for special smoking rooms fulfilling drastic conditions, see below. A special exemption was made for cafés and restaurants, clubs, casinos, bars, etc. which ended, 1 January 2008. Opinion polls suggest 70% of people support the ban. Previously, under the former implementation rules of the 1991 Évin law, restaurants, cafés etc. just had to provide smoking and non-smoking sections, which in practice were often not well separated.

Under the new regulations, smoking rooms are allowed, but are subjected to very strict conditions: they may occupy at most 20% of the total floor space of the establishment and their size may not be more than 35 m²; they need to be equipped with separate ventilation which replaces the full volume of air ten times per hour; the air pressure of the smoking room must constantly be lower than the pressure in the contiguous rooms; they have doors that close automatically; no service can be provided in the smoking rooms; cleaning and maintenance personnel may enter the room only one hour after it was last used for smoking.

Popular French cigarette brands include Gauloises and Marlboro.

The possession, sale and use of cannabis (predominantly Moroccan hashish) is illegal in France.  Since 1 March 1994, the penalties for cannabis use are from two months to a year and/or a fine, while possession, cultivation or trafficking of the drug can be punished much more severely, up to ten years. According to a 1992 survey by SOFRES, 4.7 million French people ages 12–44 have smoked cannabis at least once in their lives.

Sports and hobbies

Football (French: Le Foot) is the most popular sport in France. Other popular sports played in France are rugby union, cycling, tennis, handball, basketball and sailing. France is notable for holding and winning the FIFA World Cup in 1998 and 2018, and holding the annual cycling race Tour de France, and the tennis Grand Slam tournament the French Open. Sport is encouraged in school, and local sports clubs receive financial support from the local governments. While football is definitely the most popular, rugby union and rugby league takes dominance in the southwest, especially around the city of Toulouse (see: Rugby union in France and Rugby league in France).

The modern Olympics was invented in France, in 1894 by Pierre de Coubertin.

Professional sailing in France is centred on singlehanded and shorthanded ocean racing with the pinnacle of this branch of the sport being the Vendée Globe singlehanded around the world race which starts every 4 years from the French Atlantic coast. Other significant events include the Solitaire du Figaro, Mini Transat 6.50, Tour de France a Voile and Route du Rhum transatlantic race. France has been a regular competitor in the America's Cup since the 1970s.

Other important sports include:

 24 Hours of Le Mans – The world's oldest sports car race.
 Skiing – France has an extensive number of ski resorts in the French alps such as Tignes. Ski resorts are also located in the Pyrénées and Vosges mountain chains.
 Pétanque – The international federation is recognized by the IOC.
 Fencing – Fencing leads the list of sports for which gold medals were won for France at the Summer Olympics (see: France at the Olympics).
 Parkour – Developed in France, Parkour is a training discipline with similarities to self-defense or martial arts.
 Babyfoot (table football) – A very popular pastime in bars and homes in France, and the French are the predominant winners of worldwide table football competitions.
 Kitesurfing
 Bullfighting – Spanish style bullfighting is still popular in the southern part of France.

Like other cultural areas in France, sport is overseen by a government ministry, the Minister of Youth Affairs and Sports (France) which is in charge of national and public sport associations, youth affairs, public sports centers and national stadia (like the Stade de France).

Fashion

Along with Milan, London and New York, Paris is center of an important number of fashion shows. Some of the world's biggest fashion houses (ex: Chanel) have their headquarters in France.

The association of France with fashion dates largely to the reign of Louis XIV when the luxury goods industries in France came increasingly under royal control and the French royal court became, arguably, the arbiter of taste and style in Europe.

France renewed its dominance of the high fashion ( or ) industry in the years 1860–1960 through the establishing of the great couturier houses, the fashion press (Vogue was founded in 1892; Elle was founded in 1945) and fashion shows.  The first modern Parisian couturier house is generally considered the work of the Englishman Charles Frederick Worth who dominated the industry from 1858 to 1895. In the early twentieth century, the industry expanded through such Parisian fashion houses as the house of Chanel (which first came to prominence in 1925) and Balenciaga (founded by a Spaniard in 1937).  In the post war year, fashion returned to prominence through Christian Dior's famous "new look" in 1947, and through the houses of Pierre Balmain and Hubert de Givenchy (opened in 1952).  In the 1960s, "high fashion" came under criticism from France's youth culture while designers like Yves Saint Laurent broke with established high fashion norms by launching prêt-à-porter ("ready to wear") lines and expanding French fashion into mass manufacturing and marketing. Further innovations were carried out by Paco Rabanne and Pierre Cardin. With a greater focus on marketing and manufacturing, new trends were established in the 70s and 80s by Sonia Rykiel, Thierry Mugler, Claude Montana, Jean Paul Gaultier and Christian Lacroix.  The 1990s saw a conglomeration of many French couture houses under luxury giants and multinationals such as LVMH.

Since the 1960s, France's fashion industry has come under increasing competition from London, New York, Milan and Tokyo, and the French have increasingly adopted foreign (particularly American) fashions (such as jeans, tennis shoes).  Nevertheless, many foreign designers still seek to make their careers in France.

Pets

In 2006, 52% of French households had at least one pet: In total, 9.7 million cats, 8.8 million dogs, 2.3 million rodents, 8 million birds, and 28 million fish were kept as pets in France during this year.

Media and art

Art and museums

The first paintings of France are those that are from prehistoric times, painted in the caves of Lascaux well over 10,000 years ago. The arts were already flourishing 1,200 years ago, at the time of Charlemagne, as can be seen in many hand made and hand illustrated books of that time.

Gothic art and architecture originated in France in the 12th century around Paris and then spread to all of Europe. In the 13th century, French craftsmen developed the stained glass painting technique and sophisticated illuminated manuscripts for private devotion in the new gothic style. The final phase of gothic architecture, known as Flamboyant, also began in France in the 15th century before spreading to the rest of Europe.

The 17th century was one of intense artistic achievements : French painting emerged with a distinct identity, moving from Baroque to Classicism. Famous classic painters of the 17th century in France are Nicolas Poussin and Claude Lorrain. French architecture also proved influential with the Palace of Versailles, built for the powerful king Louis XIV, becoming the model of many European royal palaces. During the 18th century the Rococo style emerged as a frivolous continuation of the Baroque style. The most famous painters of the era were Antoine Watteau, François Boucher and Jean-Honoré Fragonard. At the end of the century, Jacques-Louis David and Dominique Ingres were the most influential painters of the Neoclassicism.

Géricault and Delacroix were the most important painters of the Romanticism. Afterwards, the painters were more realistic, describing nature (Barbizon school). The realistic movement was led by Courbet and Honoré Daumier. Impressionism was developed in France by artists such as Claude Monet, Edgar Degas, Pierre-Auguste Renoir and Camille Pissarro. At the turn of the century, France had become more than ever the center of innovative art. The Spaniard Pablo Picasso came to France, like many other foreign artists, to deploy his talents there for decades to come. Toulouse-Lautrec, Gauguin and Cézanne were painting then. Cubism is an avant-garde movement born in Paris at the beginning of the 20th century.

The Louvre in Paris is one of the most famous and the largest art museums in the world, created by the new revolutionary regime in 1793 in the former royal palace. It holds a vast amount of art of French and other artists, e.g. the Mona Lisa, by Leonardo da Vinci, and classical Greek Venus de Milo and ancient works of culture and art from Egypt and the Middle East.

Music

France boasts a wide variety of indigenous folk music, as well as styles played by immigrants from Africa, Latin America and Asia.  In the field of classical music, France has produced a number of notable composers such as Gabriel Fauré, Claude Debussy, Maurice Ravel, and Hector Berlioz while modern pop music has seen the rise of popular French hip hop, French rock, techno/funk, and turntablists/djs.

The Fête de la Musique was created in France (first held in 1982), a music festival, which has since become celebrated worldwide as world music day. It takes place every 21 June, on the first day of summer.

In 2010, the French electronic music duo, Daft Punk was admitted into the Ordre des Arts et des Lettres, an order of merit of France. Bangalter and de Homem-Christo were individually awarded the rank of Chevalier (knight)..

Theater

Cinema

France is the birthplace of cinema and was responsible for many of its early significant contributions: Antoine Lumière realized, on 28 December 1895, the first projection, with the Cinematograph, in Paris. Philippe Binant realized, on 2 February 2000, the first digital cinema projection in Europe, with the DLP CINEMA technology developed by Texas Instruments, in Paris. Several important cinematic movements, including the Nouvelle Vague, began in the country.

Additionally, France is an important Francophone film production country. A certain amount of the movies created share international distribution in the western hemisphere thanks to Unifrance. Although French cinema industry is rather small in terms of budget and revenues, it enjoys qualitative screenplay, cast and story telling. French Cinema is often portrayed as more liberal in terms of subjects (Sex, Society, Politics, Historical).  
Within the domestic market, French movies are ranked by the number of admissions. Movies are premiered on Wednesdays.

"Going to the movies" is a popular activity within metropolitan areas. Many cinema operators offer a "flat-rate pass" for approx. €20 per month. Prices per movie range between €5.50 and €10.

French major cinema operators are UGC and Pathé, mainly located in city suburbs due to the number of screens and seating capacity.

Within France many "small" cinemas are located in the downtown parts of a city, resisting the big cinema operators nationwide. Paris has the highest density of cinemas (movie theaters) in the world: biggest number of movie theaters per inhabitants, and that in most "downtown Paris" movie theaters, foreign movies which would be secluded to "art houses" cinemas in other places, are shown alongside "mainstream" works as Parisians are avid movie-goers. Proximity of restaurants, accessibility, ambiance and the showing of alternative foreign movies is often cited as being the advantage of these small theaters.

The Cinémathèque Française holds one of the largest archives of films, movie documents and film-related objects in the world. Located in Paris, the Cinémathèque holds daily screenings of films unrestricted by country of origin.

Television

Books, newspapers and magazines

France has the reputation of being a "literary culture", and this image is reinforced by such things as the importance of French literature in the French educational system, the attention paid by the French media to French book fairs and book prizes (like the Prix Goncourt, Prix Renaudot or Prix Femina) and by the popular success of the (former) literary television show "Apostrophes" (hosted by Bernard Pivot).

Although the official literacy rate of France is 99%, some estimates have placed functional illiteracy at between 10% and 20% of the adult population (and higher in the prison population).

While reading remains a favorite pastime of French youth today, surveys show that it has decreased in importance compared to music, television, sports and other activities. The crisis of academic publishing has also hit France (see, for example, the financial difficulties of the Presses universitaires de France (PUF), France's premier academic publishing house, in the 1990s).

Literary taste in France remains centered on the novel (26.4% of book sales in 1997), although the French read more non-fiction essays and books on current affairs than the British or Americans. Contemporary novels, including French translations of foreign novels, lead the list (13% of total books sold), followed by sentimental novels (4.1%), detective and spy fiction (3.7%), "classic" literature (3.5%), science fiction and horror (1.3%) and erotic fiction (0.2%). About 30% of all fiction sold in France today is translated from English (authors such as William Boyd, John le Carré, Ian McEwan, Paul Auster and Douglas Kennedy are well received).

An important subset of book sales is comic books (typically Franco-Belgian comics like The Adventures of Tintin and Astérix) which are published in a large hardback format; comic books represented 4% of total book sales in 1997. French artists have made the country a leader in the graphic novel genre and France hosts the Angoulême International Comics Festival, Europe's preeminent comics festival.

Like other areas of French culture, book culture is influenced, in part, by the state, in particular by the "Direction du livre et de la lecture" of the Ministry of Culture, which oversees the "Centre national du livre" (National Book Center).  The French Ministry of Industry also plays a role in price control.  Finally, the VAT for books and other cultural products in France is at the reduced rate of 5.5%, which is also that of food and other necessities (see here).

In terms of journalism in France, the regional press (see list of newspapers in France) has become more important than national dailies (such as Le Monde and Le Figaro) over the past century: in 1939, national dailies were 2/3 of the dailies market, while today they are less than 1/4.  The magazine market is currently dominated by TV listings magazines followed by news magazines such as L'Obs, L'Express and Le Point.

Architecture and housing

Transportation

There are significant differences in lifestyles with respect to transportation between very urbanized regions such as Paris, and smaller towns and rural areas. In Paris, and to a lesser extent in other major cities, many households do not own an automobile and simply use efficient public transport. The cliché about the Parisien is rush hour in the Métro subway. However, outside of such areas, ownership of one or more cars is standard, especially for households with children.

 Odonymy 

France has a number of traditional road naming conventions.

Holidays

Despite the principles of laïcité and the separation of church from state, public and school holidays in France generally follow the Roman Catholic religious calendar (including Easter, Christmas, Ascension Day, Pentecost, Assumption of Mary, All Saints Day, etc.). Labor Day and the National Holiday are the only business holidays determined by government statute; the other holidays are granted by convention collective (agreement between employers' and employees' unions) or by agreement of the employer.

The five holiday periods of the public school year are:
 the vacances de la Toussaint (All Saints Day) – two weeks starting near the end of October.
 the vacances de Noël (Christmas) – two weeks, ending after New Years.
 the vacances d'hiver (winter) – two weeks in February and March.
 the vacances de printemps (spring), formerly vacances de Pâques (Easter) – two weeks in April and May.
 the vacances d'été (summer), or grandes vacances (literally: big holidays) – two months in July and August.

On 1 May, Labour Day (La Fête du Travail) the French give flowers of Lily of the Valley (Le Muguet) to one another.

The National holiday (called Bastille Day in English) is on 14 July.  Military parades, called Défilés du 14 juillet, are held, the largest on the Champs-Élysées avenue in Paris in front of the President of the Republic.

On 2 November, All Souls Day (La Fête des morts), the French traditionally bring chrysanthemums to the tombs of departed family members.

On 11 November, Remembrance Day (Le Jour de la Commémoration or L' Armistice) is an official holiday.

Christmas is generally celebrated in France on Christmas Eve by a traditional meal (typical dishes include oysters, boudin blanc and the bûche de Noël), by opening presents and by attending the midnight mass (even among Catholics who do not attend church at other times of the year).

Candlemas (La Chandeleur) is celebrated with crêpes. The popular saying is that if the cook can flip a crêpe singlehandedly with a coin in the other hand, the family is assured of prosperity throughout the coming year.

The Celtic holiday Halloween, which is popular throughout the English speaking world, has grown in popularity following its introduction in the mid-1990s by the trade associations.  The growth seems to have stalled during the following decade.

Conventions
 France is the home of the International System of Units (the metric system). Some pre-metric units are still used, essentially the livre (a unit of weight equal to half a kilogram) and the quintal (a unit of weight equal to 100 kilograms).
 In mathematics, France uses the infix notation like most countries. For large numbers the long scale is used. Thus, the French use the word billion for the number 1,000,000,000,000, which in countries using short scale is called a trillion. However, there exists a French word, milliard, for the number 1,000,000,000, which in countries using the short scale is called a billion. Thus, despite the use of the long scale, one billion is called un milliard ("one milliard") in French, and not mille millions ("one thousand million"). It should also be noted that names of numbers above the milliard are rarely used. Thus, one trillion will most often be called mille milliards ("one thousand milliard") in French, and rarely un billion.
 In the French numeral notation, the comma is the decimal separator, whereas a space is used between each group of three digits (fifteen million five hundred thousand and thirty-two should be written as 15 500 032). In finance, the currency symbol is used as a decimal separator or put after the number. For example, €25,048.05 is written either 25 048€05 or 25 048.05€ (always with an extra space between the figure and the currency symbol).
 In computing, a bit is called a bit yet a byte is called an octet (from the Latin root octo, meaning "8"). SI prefixes are used.
 24-hour clock time is used, with h being the separator between hours and minutes (for example 2:30 pm is 14h30).
 The all-numeric form for dates is in the order day-month-year, using a slash as the separator (example: 31 December 1992 or 31/12/92).

Problem in defining "French" culture

Wherever one comes from, "culture" consists of beliefs and values learned through the socialization process as well as material artifacts.Hoult, T. F, ed. 1969. Dictionary of Modern Sociology, p. 93. "Culture is the learned set of beliefs, values, norms and material goods shared by group members. Culture consists of everything we learn in groups during the life course-from infancy to an old age."

The conception of "French" culture however poses certain difficulties and presupposes a series of assumptions about what precisely the expression "French" means.  Whereas American culture posits the notion of the "melting-pot" and cultural diversity, the expression "French culture" tends to refer implicitly to a specific geographical entity (as, say, "metropolitan France", generally excluding its overseas departments) or to a specific historico-sociological group defined by ethnicity, language, religion and geography. The realities of "Frenchness" however, are extremely complicated. Even before the late 18th–19th century, "metropolitan France" was largely a patchwork of local customs and regional differences that the unifying aims of the Ancien Régime and the French Revolution had only begun to work against, and today's France remains a nation of numerous indigenous and foreign languages, of multiple ethnicities and religions, and of regional diversity that includes French citizens in Corsica, Guadeloupe, Martinique and elsewhere around the globe also in America.

The creation of some sort of typical or shared French culture or "cultural identity", despite this vast heterogeneity, is the result of powerful internal forces – such as the French educational system, mandatory military service, state linguistic and cultural policies – and by profound historic events – such as the Franco-Prussian war and the two World Wars — which have forged a sense of national identity over the last 200 years. However, despite these unifying forces, France today still remains marked by social class and by important regional differences in culture (cuisine, dialect/accent, local traditions) that many fear will be unable to withstand contemporary social forces (depopulation of the countryside, immigration, centralization, market forces and the world economy).

In recent years, to fight the loss of regional diversity, many in France have promoted forms of multiculturalism and encouraged cultural enclaves (communautarisme), including reforms on the preservation of regional languages and the decentralization of certain government functions, but French multiculturalism has had a harder time of accepting, or of integrating into the collective identity, the large non-Christian and immigrant communities and groups that have come to France since the 1960s.

The last 70 years has also seen French cultural identity "threatened" by global market forces and by American "cultural hegemony". Since its dealings with the 1943 GATT free trade negotiations, France has fought for what it calls the exception culturelle, meaning the right to subsidize or treat favorably domestic cultural production and to limit or control foreign cultural products (as seen in public funding for French cinema or the lower VAT accorded to books).  The notion of an explicit exception française however has angered many of France's critics.

The French are often perceived as taking a great pride in national identity and the positive achievements of France (the expression "chauvinism" is of French origin) and cultural issues are more integrated in the body of the politics than elsewhere (see "The Role of the State", below). The French Revolution claimed universalism for the democratic principles of the Republic. Charles de Gaulle actively promoted a notion of French "grandeur" ("greatness").  Perceived declines in cultural status are a matter of national concern and have generated national debates, both from the left (as seen in the anti-globalism of José Bové) and from the right and far right (as in the discourses of the National Front).

According to Hofstede's Framework for Assessing Culture, the culture of France is moderately individualistic and high Power Distance Index.

Now, the interracial blending of some native French and newcomers stands as a vibrant and boasted feature of French culture, from popular music to movies and literature. Therefore, alongside mixing of populations, exists also a cultural blending (le métissage culturel) that is present in France. It may be compared to the traditional US conception of the melting-pot. The French culture might have been already blended in from other races and ethnicities, in cases of some biographical research on the possibility of African ancestry on a small number of famous French citizens. Author Alexandre Dumas, père possessed one-fifth black Haitian descent, and Empress Josephine Napoleon who was born and raised in the French West Indies from a plantation estate family.
We can mention as well, the most famous French-Canadian singer Celine Dion whose grandmother was a North African from Kabylie.

For a long time, the only objection to such outcomes predictably came from the far-left schools of thought. In the past few years, other unexpected voices are however beginning to question what they interpret, as the new philosopher Alain Finkielkraut coined the term, as an "Ideology of miscegenation" (une idéologie du métissage) that may come from what one other philosopher, Pascal Bruckner, defined as The Tears of the White Man (le sanglot de l'homme blanc). These critics have been dismissed by the mainstream and their propagators have been labelled as new reactionaries (les nouveaux réactionnaires), even if racist and anti-immigration sentiment has recently been documented to be increasing in France at least according to one poll.

 Cultural imperialism 
French culture, language, and education have been mobilized to further French imperial interests.

 Culture of Overseas France 
Culture within European France and Overseas France  differs. Overseas France consists of 13 French-administered territories outside Europe, mostly the remains of the French colonial empire that remained a part of the French state under various statuses after decolonization. Overseas French cultures include the cultures of Martinique and Guadeloupe in the Caribbean, the Culture of French Guiana in South America, the blend of European, African, Indian, Chinese and insular traditions in Reunion, the Polynesian cultures of French Polynesia, and the mix of indigenous Kanak, European, and Polynesian cultures of New Caledonia. 

See also

 Architecture of Normandy
 Catherinettes
 Demographics of France
 Remarkable Gardens of France
 List of French people
 List of World Heritage Sites in France

References
 Bernstein, Richard.  Fragile Glory: A Portrait of France and the French.  Plume, 1991.
 Carroll, Raymonde.  Carol Volk, translator.  Cultural Misunderstandings: The French-American Experience.  University of Chicago Press, 1990.
 Darnton, Robert.  The Great Cat Massacre and Other Episodes in French Cultural History.  Vintage, 1984. 
 Dauncey, Hugh, ed.  French Popular Culture: An Introduction.  New York: Oxford University Press (Arnold Publishers), 2003.
 DeJean, Joan.  The Essence of Style: How The French INvented High Fashion, Fine Food, Chic Cafés, Style, Sophistication, and Glamour. New York: Free Press, 2005.  
 Forbes, Jill and Michael Kelly, eds.  French Cultural Studies: An Introduction.  Clarendon Press, 1996. 
 Girod, André. " French-American class: It's a long way to France" Redleadbooks <www.usa-decouverte.com>
 Gopnik, Adam.  Paris to the Moon.  Random House, 2001.
 Hall, Edward Twitchell and Mildred Reed Hall.  Understanding Cultural Differences: Germans, French and Americans.  Intercultural Press, 1990.
 Howarth, David and Georgios Varouzakis.  Contemporary France: An Introduction to French Politics and Society.  New York: Oxford University Press (Arnold Publishers), 2003. 
 Kelly, Michael.  French Culture and Society: The Essentials.  New York: Oxford University Press (Arnold Publishers), 2001. (A Reference Guide)
 Kidd, William and Siân Reynolds, eds.  Contemporary French Cultural Studies.  Arnold Publishers, 2000. 
 Marmer, Nancy, "Out of Paris: Decentralizing French Art," Art in America, September 1986, pp. 124–137, 155–157.
 Nadeau, Jean-Benoît and Julie Barlow.  Sixty Million Frenchmen Can't Be Wrong: Why We Love France But Not The French.  Sourcebooks Trade, 2003. 
 Robb, Graham.  The Discovery of France: A Historical Geography, from the Revolution to the First World War. New York: Norton, 2007.  
  Wylie, Laurence and Jean-François Brière.  Les Français.  3rd edition. Prentice Hall, 2001.
 Zedlin, Theodore and Philippe Turner, eds.  The French''.  Kodansha International, 1996.

Notes

External links
 Frenchculture.org
 France in Brief / France From A to Z – Embassy of France in the US
 French Culture